Medical volunteerism, also medical volunteering, is volunteering in the context of providing medical treatment. While often seen in the context of volunteer physicians and nurses, the term can also cover the case of volunteers for clinical trials that are motivated by non-financial gains. Medical volunteering has in general been praised as  “ethical imperative to serve the disadvantaged”.

Motivations of medical volunteers, analyzed through the Volunteer Functions Inventory framework, have been found to be focused on the values dimension first, followed by understanding, enhancement, social, career, and protective ones. Out of these, the first two were most important. In other words, the most common reason for medical volunteering is expressing or acting on important values, such as humanitarianism and helping those less fortunate and seeking to learn more about the world and/or exercise skills that are often unused.

Short term medical volunteerism abroad, often in developing countries, is sometimes criticized as medical voluntourism. Such activities are criticized when compared to the alternative notion of sustainable capacities, i.e., work done in the context of long-term, locally-run, and foreign-supported infrastructures.  A preponderance of this criticism appears largely in scientific and peer-reviewed literature. Recently, media outlets with more general readerships have published such criticisms as well.

Dental Volunteering 

Volunteering in the context of providing dental care is dental volunteering. Volunteering in international healthcare facilities is gaining popularity. Volunteer efforts in dentistry are widespread in the underdeveloped world. The World Dental Federation (Federation Dentaire Internationale, FDI) has defined the term Dental Volunteer as "A qualified and registered/licensed dentist who provides time and work free of charge". Typical dental volunteering workforce includes, Dentist/ Dental Surgeons, Dental Specialists, Dental Hygienists, Dental and Hygienist students. The factors that encourage the desire to involve in voluntary care include a desire to give back to the community, a desire to be more understanding of patients' needs, and a desire to feel fulfilled in their work. Volunteers' have expressed reasons for giving their time and energy range from altruism and the desire to 'help others' to spiritual and career advancement. It's clear that not all dental professionals feel the same way about giving back to the community.

Dental Volunteering has a potential of making a substantial contribution for the global oral health. Significant opportunity for fresh experiences are afforded to individuals in volunteer work. They enable participants to respect various cultures and ways of life while making a constructive contribution to the target community, whether that group is domestic or international. Dental Volunteers play a crucial role in providing dental treatment to patients at community health centers. Considering that paid medical staff availability and willingness to serve cannot be assured, sustained reliance on volunteers presents significant difficulties. In some states of the United States have implemented a mechanism for volunteering in exchange for continuing education credits. It has been help underprivileged communities, however the reports have indicated that it hasn’t fixed the problem of limited access to care. Earning continuing education credits for volunteering is generally viewed as a positive development.

However, the typical approach in dental volunteering in developing  countries are often criticized. Volunteer non-profit organizations (NGO) in the dental field have made significant strides toward eliminating worldwide disparities in oral health. However, the dental NGO sector is much less well understood than the medical and health NGO sector. The FDI, published a seminal study in 2002 analyzing baseline data about dental aid organizations. Most of the dental NGOs are small in size, run on a shoestring budget, employ only a handful of people (most of whom are volunteers), lack professional management, provide inconsistent quality assurance, are unaware of relevant research, and have poor lines of communication and collaboration with one another. Concerns have been raised that certain volunteer programs may actually do more harm than good to the communities they aim to assist. It's reported that sometimes locals in host areas have a mixed reaction to volunteers. As a result of insufficient understanding, some projects have the potential to cause harm by being paternalistic, diminishing confidence in local health systems, failing to maintain patient safety, causing economic harm to local providers, and focusing more on volunteers than local communities. As a result, there is a call for further education of the concept among volunteer dental practitioners.

See also 
 Emergency Medical Service
 Hospital volunteering
 Volunteer fire department
 Volunteer tourism

References